The Scottish Midland Co-operative Society (trading as Scotmid), is an independent retail consumers' co-operative based in Edinburgh, Scotland.

Originally founded as St. Cuthbert's Co-operative Society in 1859, it merged with Dalziel Co-operative Society of Motherwell in 1981 to form Scotmid.

With over 3,900 staff, the co-operative has 177 Scotmid supermarkets and convenience stores, nine Lakes & Dales convenience stores, 17 funeral offices, and 89 Semichem health and beauty shops throughout Scotland, Northern Ireland and northern England.

Governance
Like most other retail consumers' co-operatives in the United Kingdom, Scotmid is incorporated as a registered society.

Scotmid has a committee style governance structure, similar to The Co-operative Group prior to its own major governance reforms. Scotmid Board Directors are nominated by Regional Committee members 
and elected by members from the Regions they represent (if these positions are contested).

History

In 1968, Leith Provident's 1911 department store on Great Junction Street was still operating a then unusual overhead wire system that transported a customer's payment and dividend number from the sales assistant to the cashier, returning change and receipt.

In 1995, Scotmid acquired the Scottish health and beauty retail chain Semi-Chem (since rebranded Semichem), followed in 1999 by the similar Northern Ireland business, Options. Also in 1999, Scotmid merged with Prestonpans Co-operative Society.

In 2000, Scotmid closed all 20 of its non-food department stores, which had made losses for five successive years.

In 2003, Scotmid acquired Wakefield-based national distribution business, M & S Toiletries, which it sold in 2008 to Sert UK.

In the early 21st century, Scotmid acquired several competing convenience shops in Scotland: Alldays, 64 SPAR shops and Morning, Noon & Night.

Scotmid added Dundas Fyfe funeral directors to its funeral operation in a reported £1 million buy-out deal. The head office moved from Fountainbridge, Edinburgh, where it had been since 1859, to a new purpose-built office near Newbridge.

The Fragrance House was founded by Scotmid in 2009. It specializes in perfume and by 2011 had five shops in Scotland with plans to expand to England and Northern Ireland.

On 31 March 2021, it was announced that "up to 22" Semichem stores would close.

Morning, Noon & Night

Morning Noon & Night was a Scottish convenience shop chain set up in Dundee in 1991, by retailing executive Eddie Thompson (who became chairman of Dundee United in 2002.)

In 2004, Thompson sold the company to Scotmid for £30 million.

This allowed Scotmid to add the 50 Morning, Noon & Night shops to its portfolio letting it expand into areas of Scotland, such as the Highlands, where it didn't previously have any shops.

Botterills Convenience Stores

Botterills Convenience Stores was a Scottish convenience shop founded in Blantyre, South Lanarkshire in the 1950s by the Botterill family. Trading under the name of "Botterills of Blantyre" and latterly under the SPAR banner, it ranked 19th in The Grocers Top 50 independent grocery retailers. Owner Jim Botterill sold his 51 shops to Scotmid in November 2010 for an undisclosed sum, enabling Scotmid to extend its territory south and west.

Lakes & Dales Co-operative

In 2013 Scotmid merged with the Penrith Co-operative Society which had at the time of merger operated a department store and attached supermarket in Penrith, Cumbria and 7 small food shops in Cumbria and County Durham the Penrith shops are to be rebranded as the Lakes & Dales Co-operative. The first shop to be rebranded was the Lazonby branch. In early 2015 the non food departments of the Penrith shop were closed and in February 2016 the rest of the shop closed.

In 2015 Scotmid merged with the Northumbrian Seaton Valley Co-operative Society adding its shops to the Lakes & Dales chain.

See also
British co-operative movement
Credit unions in the United Kingdom

References

External links 
  – main website
  – Scotmid Food
  – Scotmid Funerals
  – health and beauty shops

Consumers' co-operatives of the United Kingdom
Business services companies established in 1859
Retail companies established in 1859
Business services companies established in 1981
Retail companies established in 1981
Companies based in Edinburgh
Supermarkets of the United Kingdom
Defunct department stores of the United Kingdom
1981 establishments in Scotland
Organizations established in 1859
1859 establishments in Scotland
Co-operatives in Scotland
Convenience stores